Mancinella grossa is a species of sea snail, a marine gastropod mollusk, in the family Muricidae, the murex snails or rock snails.

Description
The length of the shel lattains 37.4 mm.

Distribution
This marine species occurs off Vanuatu.

References

 Houart, R. (2001). Ingensia gen. nov. and eleven new species of Muricidae (Gastropoda) from New Caledonia, Vanuatu, and Wallis and Futuna Islands. in: P. Bouchet & B.A. Marshall (eds) Tropical Deep-Sea Benthos, volume 22. Mémoires du Muséum National d'Histoire Naturelle, ser. A, Zoologie. 185: 243-26
 Claremont M., Vermeij G.J., Williams S.T. & Reid D.G. (2013) Global phylogeny and new classification of the Rapaninae (Gastropoda: Muricidae), dominant molluscan predators on tropical rocky seashores. Molecular Phylogenetics and Evolution 66: 91–102

External links
 MNHN, Paris: holotype

grossa
Gastropods described in 2001